Word, an academic journal of linguistics issued four times a year, is the publication of the International Linguistic Association (ILA). Founded in 1943 as the Linguistic Circle of New York, the ILA became one of the main sources of new ideas in American Linguistics at that time. Its journal Word was founded in 1945 with a mission to disseminate the scholarly discussion of the day and to become the journal of record for general linguistics. During several decades of intellectual ferment in linguistics, the scholarship published by Word continued to record the expansion of linguistic ideas - both theoretical and applied. Today, Word continues its broadly-based mission to reflect and record contemporary linguistic scholarship.

Among published articles, Louis Hjelmslev's significant work issued in Word in 1954 — "La stratification du langage" (Volume 10, 1954); Jean Berko Gleason's Wug test debuted in Word in 1958 — "The Child's Learning of English Morphology" (Volume 14, 1958); Charles Ferguson's "Diglossia" was published in Word (Volume 15, 1959); M.A.K. Halliday's first journal paper on systemic-functional linguistics — "Categories of the theory of grammar" — appeared in Word (Volume 17, 1961); and William Labov's very first journal article — "The social motivation of a sound change" — was in Word (Volume 19, 1963).

Each issue contains articles and reviews. Occasionally, special issues on specific topics are produced. Such issues have dealt with:

Language and language planning (30/1979);
The Spanish and Portuguese language in the Western Hemisphere (33/1982);
Text linguistics (37/1986);
Systemic linguistics (40/1989).
Papers from the 1991 conference on Indo-European Linguistics have also been published in Word.

External links 
 

Linguistics journals
Triannual journals
English-language journals